The St. Joseph Church is a Roman Catholic church in the Fratelia district of Timișoara. In the church the liturgies are celebrated in Hungarian, German and Romanian.

History 

The Roman Catholic parish of Fratelia was founded in 1932. The church was built between 1926 and 1928, during the time of the Salvatorian priest Angelicus Bugiel. The foundation stone of the Roman Catholic Church was laid in the presence of the then Vicar General , who later became the Roman Catholic Bishop of Oradea and Satu Mare. The consecration of the church was made on 6 July 1930 by Bishop Augustin Pacha.

Architecture 
The church, located at the intersection of Ana Ipătescu, Victor Hugo and Chișodei streets, is also known as Fratelia A, because there is also a small Roman Catholic church called Fratelia B. It is built in neo-Gothic style according to the plans of the architect Elemér Makai. The church has a length of 43 m and a width of 13 m. The height of the tower is 34 m. The bells were cast in 1930 by the Novotny company from Timișoara. The main altar is adorned with a wooden statue of St. Joseph, the patron saint of the church. The windows are arched in Romanesque style, made of white and yellow glass, the colors of the Holy See.

In the 1970s the church was renovated, both inside and outside, the paintings being the work of the Timișoara master, originally from Fratelia, Jakob Hahn Sr. In 1977 the church received an electric clock from Vienna, a donation from Caritas Freiburg. In 1978 the interior of the church was transformed according to the provisions of the Second Vatican Council.

References 

Religious buildings and structures in Timișoara
Roman Catholic churches in Romania